Die gefrorenen Blitze (Frozen Lightning; English-language title: Frozen Flashes; French-language title: Et l'Angleterre sera détruite, England Shall Be Destroyed) is a two-part 1967 East-German film. The plot revolves around the history of the resistance movement in Peenemünde during the Second World War and its attempt to sabotage the V-2 program.

Plot

Part 1: Target Peenemünde
on 5 November 1939, the British consulate in Norway receives the Oslo Report, but the Military Intelligence doubts its veracity. The German research in Peenemünde goes undisturbed from the British. In spite of this, various resistance groups gather information about the site and attempt to hinder the missiles' development, taking great risks.

Part 2:  Password Paperclip
After an Allied bombing wreaks great damage in Peenemünde, the local resistance manages to smuggle V-2 parts to Britain, where they would be analyzed by the Allies' technical intelligence. The Allies decide that the genius of the rockets' creator must be exploited by them. As the end of the war looms near, Peenemünde is abandoned. In Los Alamos, a new, deadlier weapon is being developed.

Cast
Alfred Müller as Dr. Grunwald
Leon Niemczyk as  Stefan
  as  the 'rocket baron' (Wernher von Braun)
Emil Karewicz as Jerzy
Victor Beaumont as chief of British intelligence
Mark Dignam as Sir John
Ewa Wiśniewska as Hanka
Fritz Diez as Adolf Hitler
Mikhail Ulyanov as General Alexander Gorbatov
Gerd Michael Henneberg as Albert Speer
Renate Blume as Ingrid
Werner Lierck as Private First Class Draeger
Georges Aubert as Father Mollard
Reimar Baur John as Dr. Kummerow
John Mercator as Colonel Briggs
Alan Winnington as chief of the reconnaissance
Peter Doherty as squadron commander
Helmut Schreiber as attaché
Jiří Vršťala as Professor Rahn
Steffen Klaus as Colpi
Vera Oelschlegel as secretary
Ingeborg Ottmann as Marianne
Achim Schmidtchen as the Obergruppenführer
Heinrich Narenta as Heinrich Himmler
Hannjo Hasse as SA officer Zech

Production
The work on Die Gefrorene Blitze began already at 1964, and took three years to be completed.  Writer Harry Thürk and director  János Veiczi conducted extensive research in four countries: the United Kingdom, France, Germany and Poland. The script was mainly based on Julius Mader's documentary report "The Secret of Huntsville—The Real Career of Rocketbaron Wernher von Braun" The producers deemed the film as one that continued the tradition of DEFA's classical antifascist pictures, focusing on the struggle of people from many different countries - including a catholic priest from France, a character whose portrayal as positive was not common in East Germany - to prevent the Nazis from developing long-range missiles. The title was derived from a common sobriquet for the V2 missiles - "Frozen Lightning".

Reception
The film was screened outside the competition in the 1969 Cannes Film Festival. It won the Golden Apsara Award in the 1969 Phnom Penh International Film Festival.

References

External links
Frozen Flashes on the IMDb.

1967 films
1960s spy films
1967 war films
German spy films
German war films
East German films
1960s German-language films
German black-and-white films
World War II spy films
Films about the German Resistance
1960s German films